Mirage is the thirteenth studio album by British-American rock band Fleetwood Mac, released on 18 June 1982 by Warner Bros. Records. This studio effort's soft rock sound stood in stark contrast to its more experimental predecessor, 1979's Tusk. Mirage yielded several singles: "Hold Me" (which peaked at number four on the US Billboard Pop Chart, remaining there for seven weeks), "Gypsy" (number 12 US Pop Chart), "Love in Store" (number 22 US Pop Chart), "Oh Diane" (number nine in the UK), and "Can't Go Back" (number 83 in the UK).

Background
Following a hiatus of over a year after the completion of the worldwide Tusk tour, the band temporarily relocated to Château d'Hérouville in France to record a new album. By this time Stevie Nicks, Mick Fleetwood, and Lindsey Buckingham had each commenced a solo career, the former to multi-platinum number-one success with 1981's Bella Donna, the latter faring not as well with his first outing Law and Order (number 32 on the US Billboard 200).

The Stevie Nicks composition "Gypsy" (number 12 Pop, number four Rock, and number 16 in Canada) was the second single from the album and was accompanied by a lengthy video directed by Russell Mulcahy. The edited version of "Gypsy" that appears on the album and single releases runs for only 4:24, but a 5½-minute version had been originally recorded.  The latter version was (initially) used in the video, and was not available on CD until the release of 1992's retrospective box set 25 Years – The Chain.

Of the other two compositions from Nicks on the album, "That's Alright" dated back to the Buckingham Nicks days of 1974, while "Straight Back" was written in the winter of 1981 and referred to her separation from then-lover, producer Jimmy Iovine, and the huge disruption she experienced to her newly established and highly successful solo career in order to rejoin Fleetwood Mac for the 1982 project (Nicks refers to this on the DVD commentary to her 2008 retrospective Crystal Visions – The Very Best of Stevie Nicks). "Straight Back" was also a US rock radio hit in late 1982.

Of Christine McVie's four compositions, three were written in collaboration with other writers: "Love in Store" with Jim Recor, ex-husband of Nicks' friend Sara Recor who later married Mick Fleetwood, "Hold Me" with singer-songwriter Robbie Patton whose second album she had recently produced and "Wish You Were Here" with lyrics from erstwhile John Mayall drummer Colin Allen. The other, "Only Over You", was credited "With thanks to Dennis Wilson for inspiration." Christine had recently ended her relationship with Wilson, a member of the Beach Boys, who would die by drowning the following year.

Three of Lindsey Buckingham's five contributions were written with co-producer Richard Dashut including the UK top-10 single "Oh Diane".

The album returned the group to the top of the US Billboard charts for the first time since their 1977 album Rumours, spending five weeks at number two. It spent a total of 18 weeks in the US top ten and has been certified double platinum for shipments in excess of two million copies in the US. It also reached number five in the UK where it has been certified platinum for shipping 300,000 copies, and number two in Australia.

Deluxe edition
A deluxe edition of Mirage was released on 23 September 2016. This expanded reissue features a remaster of the original album, 13 live tracks, B-sides, outtakes, plus other songs that did not make the final cut. Some of these songs include "Goodbye Angel" and "Teen Beat", which were both released on 25 Years: The Chain, and "Smile at You", later released on Say You Will. and "If You Were My Love" later released on Stevie Nicks' solo album 24 Karat Gold: Songs From The Vault.  The DVD-Audio disc contains both the 5.1 Surround and 24/96 Stereo Audio mixes of the original album.  Reviews of the deluxe edition were very favorable, but several noted the absence of a re-release of the "Mirage Live" 1982 concert video release, which to date has not been released on DVD in the United States and United Kingdom.

Track listing

Personnel
Fleetwood Mac
Lindsey Buckingham – guitar, vocals, additional keyboards,  lap harp on "Empire State"
Stevie Nicks – vocals, tambourine
Christine McVie – keyboards, vocals 
John McVie – bass guitar
Mick Fleetwood – drums, percussion 

Additional musician
Ray Lindsey – additional guitar on "Straight Back"

Production
Produced by: Richard Dashut, Ken Caillat, and Fleetwood Mac
Engineered by: Richard Dashut and Ken Caillat
Assistant Engineers: David Bianco, Carla Frederick
Immersive (ATMOS) mixing: Chris James
Immersive (ATMOS) mastering: Brad Blackwood

Mirage Tour video / DVD
Two of the final shows of the Mirage tour were filmed in Los Angeles in 1982. Originally released on VHS and CED videodisc in 1983, many tracks were edited out, with the loss of "Second Hand News", "Don't Stop", "Dreams", "Brown Eyes", "Oh Well", "Never Going Back Again", "Landslide", "Sara", and "Hold Me", reducing the 135 minute show to just 80 minutes on cassette.  Three of these tracks, "Second Hand News," "Brown Eyes," and "Hold Me" would later be officially released on the expanded 1980 Fleetwood Mac Live album in 2021. The running order was also completely rearranged so that Nicks' "Gypsy" followed "The Chain", whilst "You Make Loving Fun" and "Blue Letter" were moved to the first half of the edited show.

The performance also includes what is often referred to as the 'speaking in tongues' version of "Sisters of the Moon", in which Nicks delivers the song's coda in such intense gravelly vibratos that her words are rendered mysteriously indecipherable.

The concert was not released on DVD until 2003, but this was limited to Brazil on the Studio Gaba label and featured an unmastered soundtrack.

In 2006 a good quality release was issued in Australia, with an added special feature comprising six Stevie Nicks solo promotional videos for some of her singles released between 1981 and 1986. This collection had previously been issued separately on VHS in 1986 under the title Stevie Nicks – I Can't Wait, and exclusively includes a live solo version of her top ten hit "Leather and Lace" (a duet with Don Henley), which was recorded on the final night of Nicks' 1981 Bella Donna tour. The clip was not included in the 9-track edit of Nicks' "White Wing Dove" live concert VHS release in 1982, and neither was it included in the DVD supplement to her 2008 retrospective Crystal Visions – The Very Best of Stevie Nicks. To date, this is the only DVD availability of this live performance.

In 2009, another DVD incarnation of the Mirage concert was released under the title Fleetwood Mac – In Performance by the Showline label on a region-free disc.

Charts

Weekly charts

Year-end charts

Certifications

References

Bibliography

 

1982 albums
Albums produced by Christine McVie
Albums produced by John McVie
Albums produced by Lindsey Buckingham
Albums produced by Mick Fleetwood
Albums produced by Richard Dashut
Albums recorded at Record Plant (Los Angeles)
Albums recorded in a home studio
Fleetwood Mac albums
Warner Records albums